The 2021–22 NBA G League season was the 21st season of the NBA G League, the official minor league basketball organization owned by the National Basketball Association (NBA). The prior season, the league played a shortened season with 18 teams and all games were held at ESPN Wide World of Sports Complex in Bay Lake, Florida, in similar to the 2020 NBA Bubble due to the ongoing restrictions during the COVID-19 pandemic. The 2021–22 season consisted of two phases: a Showcase Cup from November 5 to December 22, with all 30 teams participating before 28 of the league teams underwent a traditional regular season intended to span 36 games for each team from January 5 to April 2 before postseason. Untimely postponements, however, would lead to a varying level of games played before the end of the season, which meant roughly 31-35 games were played by each team.

League changes
The NBA G League added one new team, had three teams relocate, and two teams rebrand for the 2021–22 season:
The Capitanes de Ciudad de México were initially planned to start playing in the G League for the 2020–21 season, but pushed back their debut in the G League to the 2021–22 season due to the pandemic. As the travel restrictions continued in the scheduling of the 2021–22 season, the Capitanes played during the Showcase Cup from November 5 to December 22 and were not able to play any home games.
The Canton Charge relocated to Cleveland to play at Cleveland State University's Wolstein Center and were re-branded as the Cleveland Charge.
The Detroit Pistons purchased and relocated the Northern Arizona Suns franchise to become the Motor City Cruise with home games in Detroit at Wayne State Arena.
The New Orleans Pelicans relocated their franchise, previously playing as the Erie BayHawks, to Birmingham, Alabama, as the Birmingham Squadron following the renovation of Legacy Arena.
The Boston Celtics rebranded their affiliate, the Maine Red Claws, as the Maine Celtics.
The Denver Nuggets affiliated with the Grand Rapids Drive, which had previously been affiliated with the Pistons, and the Drive rebranded as the Grand Rapids Gold.
Divisions were abolished in place of having the top six teams of each conference make the postseason (the last season with divisions was the 2019–20 NBA G League season, as the 2020-21 season had the top eight of the eighteen teams make the playoffs).

Additionally, the Westchester Knicks temporarily relocated their home games from White Plains, New York, to Bridgeport, Connecticut, as their home arena, the Westchester County Center, was still being used as a COVID-19 vaccination site.

The league changed its season format to be played in two stages: a 14-game Showcase Cup and then an intended 36-game regular season with a playoff. All 30 teams played in the Showcase Cup that ended with the NBA G League Winter Showcase on the weekend of December 19 to 22. The regular season was then set to start on December 27, but was then pushed back to January 5. The league standings reset for the start of the regular season for qualifying for the playoffs. The NBA G League Ignite and Capitanes de Ciudad de México will not participate in the regular season or playoffs, but will play a few exhibition games that do not count towards the other teams standings.

Other changes
This season is the first for Wilson as the G League's official ball brand. On May 14, 2020, the NBA announced a multi-year partnership with Wilson as the manufacturer and supplier of G League game balls, to succeed Spalding, which supplied the league since 2001 as the National Basketball Development League (NBDL).

Winter Showcase

Standings

Central

East

South

West

Showcase Cup
Final results.

Statistics

Regular season
As of April 2, 2022.

Eastern Conference

Western Conference

Playoffs
 Quarterfinals: April 5 (one game)
 Semifinals: April 7/8 (one game)
 Conference Finals: April 9 & 10 (one game)
 Finals: April 12 & April 14  (best-of-three)

For the fifth time in the best-of-three series era and for the first time since 2018, a team went undefeated in postseason play, as the Rio Grande Valley Vipers went 4-0 to win their fourth league title, defeating the Delaware Blue Coats in two games. The Vipers set a couple of records during the G League Finals, most notably in Game 1 when they scored 145 points in a 145–128 victory, which was the most points scored by a team in G League Finals history. Trevelin Queen scored 44 points, the second most scored in a Final; two triple-doubles were recorded by the Vipers: Daishen Nix scored 31 points, twelve rebounds, and eleven assists and Anthony Lamb scored ten points, ten rebounds, and ten assists. This was the first time a triple-double had been recorded in the League since 2013 and it was the first Finals game to feature two triple-doubles in the same game. Mfiondu Kabengele recorded eight blocks, a Finals record. The Blue Coats became the first team since the Santa Cruz Warriors (2013, 2014) to lose back-to-back G League Finals.

Finals boxscore

Statistics

Awards

Player of the Week

Player of the Month

Winter Showcase

Most Valuable Player
Jarron Cumberland, Delaware Blue Coats

All-Showcase Team
 F, Paris Bass, South Bay Lakers
 F, D. J. Wilson, Oklahoma City Blue
 F/C, Cheick Diallo, Motor City Cruise
 G, Jarron Cumberland, Delaware Blue Coats
 G, Anthony Barber, College Park Skyhawks

Notable occurrences 
 On December 26, 2021, Deividas Sirvydis of the Motor City Cruise received a call-up by the Detroit Pistons, making him the 64th player to be called up that season and breaking the record of 63 call-ups in the 2014–15 season.

References

External links
Official website